New York's 1st State Assembly district is one of the 150 districts in the New York State Assembly. It has been represented by Democratic Assemblyman Fred Thiele since 2013. Before 2022, Thiele was the only Assemblyman registered with the Independence Party.

Geography 
District 1 is located entirely within Suffolk County, comprising the southern portion of the county. It stretches east to include the southeastern portion of the town of Brookhaven, most of The Hamptons and Montauk.

2010s 
District 1 is located entirely within Suffolk County, comprising the southern portion of the county. It stretches east to include The Hamptons and Montauk.

Recent election results

2022

2020

2018

2016

2014

2012

References 

1
Suffolk County, New York